Ebenezer Aboagye (born 10 January 1994) is a Ghanaian professional footballer who plays as a midfielder for Berekum Arsenal. He previously played for Ghanaian Premier League side Aduana Stars.

Career

Aduana Stars 
Aboagye secured a move to Dormaa-based side Aduana Stars in January 2020 ahead of the start of the 2019–20 Ghana Premier League season. He made his debut on 29 February 2020, coming on in the 60th minute for Yahaya Mohammed in a 1–0 victory over Dreams FC. That remained his only appearance in the league before it was cancelled as a result of the COVID-19 pandemic in June 2020. In November 2020, he made the cut for the 2020–21 season squad list as the league was set to restart in November 2020. He made 4 appearances before joining Berekum Arsenal during the second round of the season.

Berekum Arsenal 
In March 2021, during the second transfer period ahead of the second round of the season, Aboagye joined Berekum Arsenal who featured in the Zone 1 of the Ghana Division One League.

References

External links 
 
 

1994 births
Living people
Association football midfielders
Ghanaian footballers
Aduana Stars F.C. players
Ghana Premier League players
Berekum Arsenal players